Digoi is a village in Bakshi Ka Talab block of Lucknow district, Uttar Pradesh, India. As of 2011, its population is 1,000, in 172 households. It is the seat of a gram panchayat.

References 

Villages in Lucknow district